"Rainbow" is a song by Scottish rock band the Marmalade, released as a single in June 1970. It peaked at number 3 on the UK Singles Chart.

Reception 
"Rainbow" was the follow-up single to the UK top-three and US top-ten single "Reflections of My Life". Billboard wrote that "this folk favored rhythm ballad follow up has all the sales and chart potency of the recent smash". Cash Box wrote that the "Deep brown bass line, Hollies-like harmonies, and some warm mouth harp work add up to a dynamite summer sales package".

In 2002, Robin Carmody of Freaky Trigger described the harmonica-led "Rainbow" as "a desperately poignant final aim for a love (or rather, perhaps, a feeling of personal contentment) fading inexorably, desperately looking out to feel it as it dies", concluding that it is "a wonderful song of yearning, and is the perfect farewell to the dying 20 years of shared national innocence." He further named it among ten British bubblegum pop classics, writing that "[s]ome of the greatest Britgummers let go of their jollity and breathe pure melancholia and, at heart, deep sadness."

Personnel 
 Dean Ford – lead vocals
 Junior Campbell – keyboards, vocals
 Pat Fairley – guitar, bass
 Graham Knight – bass
 Alan Whitehead – drums

Charts

References 

1970 singles
Decca Records singles
London Records singles
Marmalade (band) songs
1970 songs
Songs written by Junior Campbell
Bubblegum pop songs